Ohio County is a county located in the Northern Panhandle of the U.S. state of West Virginia. As of the 2020 census, the population was 42,425. Its county seat is Wheeling. The county was formed in 1776 from the District of West Augusta, Virginia. It was named for the Ohio River, which forms its western boundary with the state of Ohio. West Liberty (formerly Black's Cabin) was designated as the county seat in 1777, serving to 1797.

Ohio County is part of the Wheeling, WV-OH Metropolitan Statistical Area.

Geography
It is the third-smallest county in West Virginia by area.
The county is drained by Wheeling and other small creeks.

In 1863, West Virginia's counties were divided into civil townships, with the intention of encouraging local government.  This proved impractical in the heavily rural state, and in 1872 the townships were converted into magisterial districts.  Ohio County was divided into five districts: Center, Clay, Liberty, Madison, Richland, Ritchie, Triadelphia, Union, Washington, and Webster.  Centre, Clay, Madison, Union, and Webster Districts all lay within the city of Wheeling, as did part of Washington District.

By 1880, part of Ritchie District had also been subsumed by Wheeling.  In the 1970s, the ten historic magisterial districts were consolidated into five new districts: Liberty Triadelphia; Madison, Union Clay, Washington District; Titchie Webster Center District, and Triadelphia.  These were further consolidated in the 1980s to form District 1, District 2, and District 3.

Major highways

Adjacent counties
Brooke County (north)
Washington County, Pennsylvania (east)
Marshall County (south)
Belmont County, Ohio (west)
Jefferson County, Ohio (northwest)

Ohio County is one of four counties in the United States to border a state with which it shares the same name (the other three counties are Nevada County, California; Texas County, Oklahoma; and Delaware County, Pennsylvania).

National protected area
Ohio River Islands National Wildlife Refuge (part)

Demographics

2000 census
As of the census of 2000, there were 47,427 people, 19,733 households, and 12,155 families residing in the county. The population density was 447 people per square mile (172/km2). There were 22,166 housing units at an average density of 209 per square mile (81/km2). The racial makeup of the county was 94.50% White, 3.57% Black or African American, 0.09% Native American, 0.78% Asian, 0.03% Pacific Islander, 0.13% from other races, and 0.91% from two or more races. 0.50% of the population were Hispanic or Latino of any race. 27.0% were of German, 13.7% Irish, 10.4% English, 8.4% Italian, 8.3% American and 6.7% Polish ancestry.

There were 19,733 households, out of which 25.90% had children under the age of 18 living with them, 47.30% were married couples living together, 11.20% had a female householder with no husband present, and 38.40% were non-families. 33.70% of all households were made up of individuals, and 16.00% had someone living alone who was 65 years of age or older. The average household size was 2.27 and the average family size was 2.91.

In the county, the population was spread out, with 21.30% under the age of 18, 10.50% from 18 to 24, 25.10% from 25 to 44, 24.40% from 45 to 64, and 18.80% who were 65 years of age or older. The median age was 41 years. For every 100 females there were 87.80 males. For every 100 females age 18 and over, there were 84.00 males.

The median income for a household in the county was $30,836, and the median income for a family was $41,261. Males had a median income of $31,132 versus $21,978 for females. The per capita income for the county was $17,734. About 11.50% of families and 15.80% of the population were below the poverty line, including 20.10% of those under age 18 and 10.40% of those age 65 or over.

2010 census
As of the census of 2010, there were 44,443 people, 18,914 households, and 11,181 families residing in the county. The racial makeup of the county was 93.2% white, 3.7% black or African American, 0.8% Asian, 0.1% American Indian, 0.2% from other races, and 1.9% from two or more races. Those of Hispanic or Latino origin made up 0.8% of the population. In terms of ancestry, 34.0% were German, 19.1% were Irish, 14.4% were English, 8.5% were Italian, 7.2% were Polish, and 5.7% were American.

Of the 18,914 households, 24.6% had children under the age of 18 living with them, 43.4% were married couples living together, 11.7% had a female householder with no husband present, 40.9% were non-families, and 35.3% of all households were made up of individuals. The average household size was 2.21 and the average family size was 2.86. The median age was 43.5 years.

The median income for a household in the county was $39,669 and the median income for a family was $54,909. Males had a median income of $42,213 versus $28,211 for females. The per capita income for the county was $23,950. About 11.9% of families and 15.9% of the population were below the poverty line, including 25.2% of those under age 18 and 9.0% of those age 65 or over.

Government
Ohio County is governed by a three-member county commission. The three county commissioners are elected from single-member magisterial districts and serve six-year terms, staggered so that one seat is up for election every even year. The County Commission annually chooses its own President. The Ohio County Commissioners are Commission President Randy Wharton, Zachary Abraham, and Don Nickerson.  The county commission typically appoints a county administrator to oversee the daily executive duties for the Commission. The current county administrator is Randy Russell. In addition to the three members of the county commission, other elected officials include a county clerk, currently Michael E. Kelly, and a county assessor, currently Tiffany Hoffmann.

Ohio County is part of the West Virginia's First Judicial Circuit, which also includes nearby Hancock and Brooke counties. In West Virginia, circuit judges are elected in non-partisan elections to eight-year terms. The current judges of the First Judicial Circuit are Jason A. Cuomo, Michael J. Olejasz, David Sims, and Ronald E. Wilson.  The clerk of the circuit court is elected in a partisan election and serves a six-year term. The current clerk of the First Judicial Circuit in Ohio County is Brenda Miller. Ohio County is part of the First Family Court Circuit of West Virginia, which covers the same three territories as the First Judicial Circuit. In West Virginia, Family Court judges have been elected to eight-year terms since 2008.  The current judges of the First Family Circuit are Joyce D. Chernenko and Heather Wood.

Magistrates are elected in non-partisan elections serving four-year terms. Vacancies occurring in unexpired terms can be filled by a respective Circuit Court judge. Unlike Circuit Court and Family Court judges, magistrates are not required to be attorneys. Ohio County currently has four magistrates: Charles W. Murphy, Patricia L. Murphy, Joseph E. Roxby, and Janine L. Varner.

In West Virginia, prosecuting attorneys in each county are elected in partisan elections to four-year terms, currently Scott R. Smith. County sheriffs (who also serve ex-officio as county treasurer) are elected by each county to a four-year term, currently Thomas J. Howard.  They are limited to two terms.

Politics
In the West Virginia Senate, most of Ohio County is part of the first Senate district, along with Hancock, Brooke, and Marshall counties.  The district is represented by Owens Brown (D-Wheeling) and Ryan Weld (R-Wellsburg).

In the West Virginia House of Delegates, parts of Ohio County are represented by the second, third, and fourth House of Delegates districts. The Second District is represented by Delegate Philip Diserio (D-Follansbee). The Third District is represented by Delegate Shawn Fluharty (D-Wheeling) and Delegate Erikka Storch (R-Wheeling). The Fourth District is represented by Delegate Charlie Reynolds (R) and Delegate Lisa Zukoff (D-Moundsville). All Delegates to the state House serve two-year terms.

In the United States House of Representatives, Ohio County is part of the West Virginia's 1st congressional district, which includes nearly all of the northern part of the state. The current Representative is David McKinley, a Republican from Wheeling in Ohio County. West Virginia’s two senators, who represent the entire state, are Shelley Moore Capito and Joe Manchin, a Republican from Charleston and a Democrat from Fairmont, respectively.

Although powerfully Unionist during the Civil War, Ohio County politics differs substantially from the two more northerly counties of the Northern Panhandle. The county was a competitive swing county for most of the period between Reconstruction and the end of the twentieth century, voting for the popular vote winner in every election except 1916, 1968 and 1976. Since 2000, like all of West Virginia, its conservative white voters have trended Republican due to a combination of declining unionization and differences with the Democratic Party’s liberal views on social issues. The trend has been less extreme than in most counties of the state.

Education

Colleges and universities
West Liberty University
Wheeling Jesuit University
West Virginia Northern Community College
West Virginia Business College

Public schools
All public schools within Ohio County operate under the jurisdiction of Ohio County Schools with the consolidated high school housing grades 9–12, middle schools housing grades 6–8, and elementary schools housing grades K-5.

Ohio County Schools has a five-member elected Board of Education Board of Education  (Molly J. Aderholt, Christine N. Carder, David Croft, Sarah C. Koegler, President Zachary T. Abraham, Superintendent Dr. Kimmberly Miller, and an Assistant Superintendent Rick Jones. In addition, the Board of Education has an Attendance Director (Wm. Jeffrey Laird).

Wheeling Park High School
Bridge Street Middle School
Triadelphia Middle School
Warwood Middle School
Wheeling Middle School
Bethlehem Elementary School
Elm Grove Elementary School
Madison Elementary School
Middle Creek Elementary School
Ritchie Elementary School
Steenrod Elementary School
Warwood Grade School
Woodsdale Elementary School

Private and parochial schools
The Diocese of Wheeling-Charleston operates several K-8 schools and one high school in Ohio County.
Wheeling Central Catholic High School
Corpus Christi Parish School
Our Lady of Peace School (Located in Marshall County but also serves Ohio County students)
St. Michael Parish School
St. Vincent de Paul Parish School
Wheeling Catholic Elementary (Closed)

Additionally, there are two private schools in Ohio County.
Linsly School
Wheeling Country Day School

Communities

City
Wheeling (county seat; partly in Marshall County)
Wheeling Neighborhoods: Clator, Dimmydale, Downtown, East Wheeling, Edgwood (annexed 1920), Elm Grove (annexed 1920), Fulton (annexed 1920), Grandview, Greggsville, Leatherwood (annexed 1920), Manchester, Morningside, North Park, North Wheeling, Overbrook, Patterson (annexed 1920), Pleasanton (annexed 1920), Pleasant Valley (annexed 1920), Richietown (annexed 1871), Springdale, South Wheeling (annexed 1871), Warwood (annexed 1920), Wheeling Island, Woodsdale (formerly Woodlawn, annexed 1920)

Towns
Triadelphia
West Liberty

Villages
Bethlehem
Clearview
Valley Grove

Magisterial districts
District 1
District 2
District 3

Unincorporated communities

Betty Zane
Clinton
Eden
Elm Grove
Greggsville
Mount Echo
Mozart
Point Mills
Potomac
Roneys Point
Shannon
Twilight
Valley Camp
Warwood

Whitfield

The Communities of Warwood, Woodsdale, Elm Grove, Betty Zane Addition, Greggsville, North Park, Overbrook, Edgwood and Linwood are all incorporated into the city of Wheeling

Notable residents

George W. Atkinson (R) – Governor of West Virginia (1897–1901);
Nathan B. Scott (R) – U.S. Senator (1899–1911)
Walter L. Fisher (R) – United States Secretary of the Interior (1911–1913)

Miscellaneous information

Dog Races and Gaming
In 2007, the West Virginia Legislature adopted HB2718 which created Chapter 29-22 C of the West Virginia Code and permits county residents where racetracks are located to vote on expansion to table games. Ohio County was the first county in West Virginia to take action concerning the matter when the Ohio County Commission initiated a special election date of June 9 for the referendum. The ballot initiative successfully passed in Ohio County with 66% of the vote. The measure permits Wheeling Island Racetrack and Gaming Center to operate table games such as blackjack and poker. On June 9, Jefferson County voters rejected their ballot measure. On June 30, Hancock County voters approved their ballot measure. Kanawha County has scheduled a special election for August 11. While the West Virginia Family Foundation vowed to challenge the constitutionality of HB 2718, it announced on August 7 that it would not file any appeal on the matter. According to newspaper accounts, the West Virginia Lottery Commission has set November 1, 2007 as the latest date at which table games will begin preliminary operation at Wheeling Island Racetrack and Gaming Center.

Metro government
In 2006, the West Virginia Legislature adopted a new section to the West Virginia code – Chapter 7A – which provided for the consolidation of cities, cities with counties, or counties with counties. Interest has been expressed by some Ohio County residents and officials and has become the main political endeavour of a local council of churches called "Hopeful City". As of March 2007, no official action has been taken in Ohio County on this matter. Other municipalities in West Virginia are considering consolidation including Beckley-Raleigh County and Fairmont-Marion County. The most significant proposals under this legislation include a consolidation of Wirt County with Wood County and a population consolidation for Kanawha-Putnam-Cabell counties.

Other Topics
The Ohio County Fair is held annually in October at Site 1 in Oglebay Park.
When Ohio County was formed in 1776, its area was much larger totaling  and included portions of what is now Washington and Greene Counties in Pennsylvania. The formation of the Mason–Dixon line and resolution of border disputes between Pennsylvania and Virginia began the first in a long series of reductions in the county's size.

See also
Bear Rock Lakes Wildlife Management Area
 Castleman Run Lake Wildlife Management Area
National Register of Historic Places listings in Ohio County, West Virginia

Footnotes

References

External links
Community Foundation for the Ohio Valley, Inc. Website
Ohio County Schools Website
Ohio County Sheriff's Department Website
Ohio County Public Library Website
Ohio County Economic Development Home Page
Wheeling Area Genealogical Website
History of Wheeling City and Ohio County, West Virginia compiled by the Hon. Gibson Lamb Cranmer

 
West Virginia counties on the Ohio River